Ia Grai (Bahnar language: Yă-grai) is a rural district (huyện) of Gia Lai province in the Central Highlands region of Vietnam. As of 2003 the district had a population of 74,176. The district covers an area of 1,156 km². The district capital lies at Ia Kha.

Divisions
The district contains the urban commune, Ia Kha, which is the seat, and the communes of Ia Chia, Ia Dêr, Ia Hrung, Ia Bá, Ia Krai, Ia O, Ia Pếch, Ia Sao, Ia Tô, Ia Yok, Ia Grăng and Ia Khai.

References

Districts of Gia Lai province